La Voix is the French Canadian version of the Dutch reality vocal competition created by John de Mol  The Voice of Holland . Season 4 of La Voix was broadcast from 2016 on TVA and is hosted for a fourth consecutive season by Charles Lafortune. Éric Lapointe, Marc Dupré and Pierre Lapointe season 3 judges all returned, whereas third season judge Isabelle Boulay was replaced by Ariane Moffatt, who returned after a two-season hiatus.

Teams 
Key

Season

Blind Auditions

Episode 1 
Group performance : Quand la musique est bonne - Jean-Jacques Goldman

Episode 2

Episode 3

Episode 4

Episode 5

Les duels 
Co-coaches for the battles:
 Marie-Pierre Arthur for Team Ariane Moffatt
 Michel Rivard for Team Éric Lapointe
 Diane Tell for Team Pierre Lapointe
 Alex Nevsky for Team Marc Dupré

Episode 6 
 The contestant wins the battle and advances to the Chants de Bataille or Live Shows
 The contestant loses the battle and is eliminated 
 The contestant loses the battle but is stolen by another coach

Episode 7

Episode 8

Les chants de bataille (Knockouts) 
At this stage of the competition, each team has 8 members. The coach needs to select 5 artists in his or her team that will go directly to the Live Shows. The 3 remaining contestants then each sing a song to win the 6th place of their team for the Live Shows. At the end of the performances, the coach picks one of the three artists to move on and sing in the Live Shows, while the other two are eliminated.

Episode 9 
 The contestant is safe
 The contestant is eliminated

Live Shows 
The 4 remaining episodes were broadcast live.
  The contestant is safe
  The contestant is eliminated

Episode 10 
At the start of the show, Karim Ouellet sang with the 12 artists that were to perform on that night.

Épisode 11 
At the start of the show, Mika sang with the 12 artists that were to perform on that night.

Semifinals: Crossed-Battles 
That year saw the introduction of the Crossed-Battles. Each coach had to pair each of his or her two remaining contestants to a singer from another team. The winner of the ''battle'' was determined only by public votes. In the end, the four singers who had the most points advanced on to the finals, no matter what team they were from.

At the start of the show, Marie-Mai sang with the 8 semi-finalists.

Finals 
DNCE, Alessia Cara and Kevin Bazinet, winner of the 3rd season of La Voix, among others, performed with the 4 finalists.

Stéphanie St-Jean from Team Pierre Lapointe won the title, obtaining 32% of popular vote. 

La Voix
2016 Canadian television seasons